Michael John Pickering (born 29 September 1956) is an English former professional footballer who played as a central defender.

Career
Born in Mirfield, Pickering played for Barnsley, Southampton, Sheffield Wednesday, Norwich City, Bradford City, Rotherham United, York City, Stockport County and Hallam.

References

1956 births
Living people
English footballers
English expatriate footballers
Barnsley F.C. players
Southampton F.C. players
Sheffield Wednesday F.C. players
San Diego Sockers (NASL) players
Norwich City F.C. players
Bradford City A.F.C. players
Rotherham United F.C. players
York City F.C. players
Stockport County F.C. players
Hallam F.C. players
English Football League players
North American Soccer League (1968–1984) players
Expatriate soccer players in the United States
Association football defenders
English expatriate sportspeople in the United States